Jalbun  is a Palestinian village in the West Bank, located 13 km east of the city of Jenin in the northern West Bank. According to the Palestinian Central Bureau of Statistics, the town had a population of 2,493 inhabitants in mid-year 2006. The primary healthcare facilities for Jalbun are described by the Ministry of Health as level 2.

History
Ceramics from the Byzantine era have been found here.

Ottoman era
In 1838 it was noted as an inhabited village, Jelbon, located in the District of Jenin, also called Haritheh esh-Shemaliyeh district.

In 1870 Victor Guérin found that Jalbun was divided into two quarters, with houses built of adobe. In the centre was an ancient mosque, situated east to west, which Guérin took to be a former church. There were ancient cisterns dug into rocks.

In 1882 Jalbun was described as a “small village in a remote position on one of the spurs of the Gilboa range. It is surrounded with plough-land, and built of mud and stone, and supplied by  cisterns”," in the PEF's Survey of Western Palestine.

British Mandate  era
In the 1922 census of Palestine, conducted  by the British Mandate authorities, Jalbun had a population of 410; 405 Muslims and 5 Christians,  where the Christians were all Orthodox. The population increased in the 1931 census to 564, all Muslim, in a total of 119  houses.

In the 1944/5 statistics  the population of Jalbun, (including Kh. el Mujaddaa) was 610, all Muslims, with 33,959 dunams of land, according to an official land and population survey.  243 dunams were used  for plantations and irrigable land, 19,104 for cereals, while 25 dunams were built-up (urban) land.

Jordanian era
In the wake of the 1948 Arab–Israeli War, and after the 1949 Armistice Agreements, Jalbun came under Jordanian rule.

Israeli forces attacked Jalbun village, with small arms, on the 5 December 1949, they then expelled the inhabitants from their village causing fatal casualties amongst the villagers. The Jordanian government strongly protested against unwarranted Israeli action and called the UN Secretary-General to notify the United Nations Security Council to take prompt and strict measures to return expelled Palestinians to their village, to hand back their looted belongings, and to compensate the villagers for all losses and damages.

The Jordanian census of 1961 found 826 inhabitants.

post-1967
Since the Six-Day War in 1967, Jalbun has been under  Israeli occupation.

Footnotes

Bibliography

External links
Welcome To Jalbun, Palestine Remembered
Jalbun, Welcome to Palestine
Survey of Western Palestine, Map 9: IAA, Wikimedia commons 

Villages in the West Bank
Jenin Governorate
Municipalities of the State of Palestine